Garden City National Forest was established as the Garden City Forest Reserve by the U.S. Forest Service in Kansas on July 25, 1905 with . It became a National Forest on March 4, 1907. On May 15, 1908 it was expanded and renamed Kansas National Forest, and on December 1, 1915 it was abolished.

The project was intended as a research project to establish an inventory of suitable tree species for planting in the high plains climate. Plantings in 1906 with 50,000 yellow pines and 30,000 hackberry, locust and Osage orange trees, followed the next year with 170,000 additional trees including black locust, jack pine, Scotch pine and other evergreens. Prairie fires and drought killed most of the trees, and additional plantings were unsuccessful. The best performing trees never exceeded  in height during the experiment. The land was dispersed to homesteaders after disestablishment.

A  remainder of the designated lands is maintained by the state of Kansas as the Sandsage Bison Range & Wildlife Area, formerly the Finney Game Refuge. A remnant of the tree planting program is visible in one of the reserve's pastures.

References

External links
Forest History Society
Listing of the National Forests of the United States and Their Dates (from Forest History Society website) Text from Davis, Richard C., ed. Encyclopedia of American Forest and Conservation History. New York: Macmillan Publishing Company for the Forest History Society, 1983. Vol. II, pp. 743-788.
Kansas National Forest  at Kansapedia
Establishment proclamation, including maps at Kansas Memory
Sandsage Bison Range Wildlife Area

Former National Forests of the United States
Protected areas established in 1905
1905 establishments in Kansas
Protected areas disestablished in 1915
1915 disestablishments in the United States